Fernanda Saponara Rivva (born July 12, 2001) is a Peruvian female badminton player who competes internationally.

Early life
Her whole family is made up of athletes (especially in basketball), so she started gymnastics and basketball when she was little. She loved these sports, but one day she told her parents that she wanted to practice a racket sport in the summer and enrolled in an academy. That's where she started playing badminton. So at a young age she used to do basketball, gymnastics and badminton at the same time, but at 13 years old she made the decision to dedicate herself only to badminton.

Career 
She won the Peru Junior International in March 2016 in the U19 singles event and was runner-up in girls doubles and mixed doubles.
In December 2016, Fernanda Saponara Rivva won the Girls' singles U17 event and reached the semi-final in both the mixed doubles U17 and adult event at the 2016 South American Badminton Championships in her hometown Lima.

In February 2017, Fernanda Saponara Rivva represented Peru at the Pan American Badminton Championships held in Santo Domingo, Dominican Republic and helped the Peruvian team win the fourth place in the Pan Am Mixed Team Championships. In March of the same year, she played the Peru International Series and lost with 17–21, 10–21 to the top seed and teammate Daniela Macias in the women's singles semi-final; In the women's doubles semi-final she played with Micaela Flores Vasquez De Velasco and lost 12–21, 19–21 to teammates Inés Castillo and Paula la Torre Regal. In April of the same year, she and Micaela Flores Vasquez De Velasco participated in the Peru International Challenge. In the women's doubles semi-final, they lost 15–21, 8–21 to Jacqueline Lima and Samia Lima, the No. 2 seeds from Brazil. In June of the same year, she played the Guatemala Badminton Future Series and lost 21–23, 18–21 in the women's singles final to the top seed, Guatemala's Nikte Alejandra Sotomayor. In August of the same year, she played the Carebaco International Open and lost 11–21, 21–23 in the women's singles semi-final to the top seed from America Jamie Subandhi.

In October 2017 she won a gold medal for Peru at the II South American Youth Games held at Santiago, Chile beating Brazilian Sania Valeria Passos Lima in the final. She also won a silver medal in doubles and a bronze medal in mixed doubles at the same event. Also in October of the same year, she played the Santo Domingo Open and lost 9-21, 10–21 in the women's singles final to No. 6 seed American Jamie Xu; In the mixed doubles semi-final with her partner Diego Subasti Tocumura, she lost 14–21, 8–21 to the top seeded duo from Cuba Leodannis Martínez / Tahimara Oropeza. In November of the same year, she played the Suriname International and lost 19–21, 8–21 in the women's singles final to the No. 2 seed from Cuba Tahimara Oropeza, reaching her third runner-up singles spot of the year 2017. In the same successful year 2017 she also won the Argentina Junior U-19 International in the doubles and mixed doubles events and was runner-up in the girls' singles event. She won the 2017 Carebaco U19 junior title in the girls' singles and also won the Santo Domingo Junior International 2017 in the mixed doubles event.

In March 2018, Fernanda Saponara Rivva and Micaela Flores Vasquez De Velasco played the Jamaica International and lost to the United States of America pair Jamie Hsu / Jamie Subandhi 13–21, 12–21 in the women's doubles semi-finals. In May of the same year, she attended the Peru Badminton Future Series and lost 12–21, 12–21 to Brazilian star Fabiana Silva in the women's singles semi-final; Together with compatriot Bruno Barrueto Deza the mixed doubles semi-final was lost 19–21, 21–15, 15–21 to No. 2 seeds and teammates Diego Mini / Paula la Torre Regal. In July of the same year, she represented Peru at the Pan Am Junior Badminton Championships held in Salvador, Bahia in Brazil. In the girls' singles semi-finals, she lost 6-21, 14–21 to Wu Xier, the 3rd/4th seed from Canada.

In October 2018 she represented Peru at the 2018 Youth Olympics in Buenos Aires, Argentina, she qualified as #15 in the world junior ranking.

At the Pan Am Junior Badminton Championships 2019 in Moncton, Canada she won a girls' singles U19 bronze medal. She was the only under-19 medallist from outside of the U.S. or Canada.
She won four medals at the 2019 South American Badminton Championships in Guayaquil, Ecuador. Winning gold at the girls' singles and mixed doubles U19 events with teammate Nicolas Macias Brandes, silver at the women's singles event and bronze at the girls' doubles U-19 event with compatriot Yue Yang Cao.

Achievements

Pan Am Junior Badminton Championships
Girls' singles U19

South American Badminton Championships
Women's singles

Women's doubles

Mixed doubles

South American Junior Badminton Championships
Girls' singles U19

Girls' doubles U19

Mixed doubles U19

BWF International Challenge/Series (3 runners-up) 
Women's singles

  BWF International Challenge tournament
  BWF International Series tournament
  BWF Future Series tournament

References

2001 births
Living people
Sportspeople from Lima
Peruvian female badminton players
Badminton players at the 2018 Summer Youth Olympics
21st-century Peruvian women